Bobby's Kodak is a 1908 American silent short comedy film directed by Wallace McCutcheon and starring Edward Dillon and Robert Harron. The film was released by American Mutoscope & Biograph on February 10, 1908.

Cast
Edward Dillon as Father
Robert Harron as Son

Preservation
The film was considered a lost film for decades until a copy was found in the Library of Congress.

See also
List of American films of 1908

References

External links

1908 comedy films
Silent American comedy films
1908 films
American black-and-white films
American silent short films
1900s rediscovered films
Biograph Company films
Films directed by Wallace McCutcheon Sr.
Rediscovered American films
1908 short films
1900s American films